Pâlis, officially Palis, is a former commune in the Aube department in north-central France. On 1 January 2016, it was merged into the new commune Aix-Villemaur-Pâlis.

Population

S ee also 

 Communes of the Aube department

References 

Former communes of Aube
Aube communes articles needing translation from French Wikipedia
Populated places disestablished in 2016
States and territories disestablished in 2016